Rivière des Rochers (French for "River of Rocks") is a river in Alberta in the Peace–Athabasca Delta and Wood Buffalo National Park. It is the main outflow of Lake Athabasca and flows northward, around many islands, and meets with the Peace River to form the Slave River. Near its mouth, the river splits into multiple channels, and forms a delta on the Slave River.  During high water level periods in the late spring and summer, the flow of the Rivière des Rochers can sometimes reverse, with water flowing from the Peace River system back into Lake Athabasca.

References

Rivers of Alberta